Leona G. Telek (born April 6, 1931) is a former Republican member of the Pennsylvania House of Representatives.

References

Republican Party members of the Pennsylvania House of Representatives
Women state legislators in Pennsylvania
Living people
1931 births
21st-century American women